Tom Noordhoff (born 19 July 1995) is a Dutch footballer who plays as a defensive midfielder for FC Lisse in the Derde Divisie.

Club career

Ajax
On 11 May 2012, Noordhoff signed a three-year contract with Ajax, tying him down to the club until 30 June 2015. He made his debut for Jong Ajax in an Eerste Divisie match against Achilles '29 on 8 September 2013. He made a total of 15 appearances playing for the reserves team in the Dutch second division, while unable to break into the first team, his contract was not extended.

Telstar
On 29 April 2015 it was announced that Noordhoff would return to SC Telstar, the club he had joined Ajax from during his youth years. In April 2016, it was announced that his contract would not be extended.

Late career
Noordhoff signed with Almere City as his contract expired with Telstar, but he made no appearances for their first team during his sole season at the club. 

On 11 April 2017, he signed with OFC Oostzaan competing in the Derde Divisie. There, he had ambitions of reaching the third-tier Tweede Divisie with the club. 

Noordhoff signed with FC Lisse on 9 January 2019, joining the club from June 2019.

Career statistics

References

External links 
 

1995 births
Living people
Dutch footballers
Association football defenders
Eerste Divisie players
Derde Divisie players
Jong Ajax players
SC Telstar players
Almere City FC players
FC Lisse players
Footballers from Haarlem
OFC Oostzaan players